The Roman Catholic Diocese of Nalgonda is a diocese located in the city of Nalgonda in the Ecclesiastical province of Hyderabad in India.

History
 May 31, 1976: Established as Diocese of Nalgonda from the Metropolitan Archdiocese of Hyderabad and Diocese of Warangal

Leadership
 Bishops of Nalgonda (Latin Rite)
 Bishop Joji Govindu (April 21, 1997 – July 31, 2021)
 Bishop Innayya Chinna Addagatla (April 17, 1989 – July 1, 1993)
 Bishop Mathew Cheriankunnel, P.I.M.E. (May 31, 1976 – December 22, 1986)

References

External links
 GCatholic.org 
 Catholic Hierarchy 

Roman Catholic dioceses in India
Christian organizations established in 1976
Roman Catholic dioceses and prelatures established in the 20th century
Christianity in Telangana
1976 establishments in Andhra Pradesh
Nalgonda district